Arka (Slovak: Jarka) is a village in Borsod-Abaúj-Zemplén county, Hungary.

External links 
 Street map

See also
 Arka Gdynia

Populated places in Borsod-Abaúj-Zemplén County